The Mooresburg School is a one-story building in Mooresburg, Pennsylvania, USA, that was constructed in 1875 and rebuilt in 1891. It is a brick vernacular building measuring thirty-five feet by twenty-eight feet on a fieldstone foundation and is located on the south side of Pennsylvania Route 642 and Pennsylvania Route 45 one half mile east of Mooresburg. It was listed on the National Register of Historic Places in 1987.

History
The Mooresburg One Room School was constructed in 1875 by Liberty Township near the small village of Mooresburg. In 1891, the Mooresburg School was "rebuilt" by Liberty Township, as indicated on a datestone. It is not known how the school was rebuilt. Mooresburg One Room School remained opened and continued to educate local children in grades one through eight until 1964 when it was acquired by the Montour County Historical Society. It is now a museum.

See also
Education in the United States
National Register of Historic Places

References

External links

Montour County Historical Society
Description of Mooresburg School and History

School buildings on the National Register of Historic Places in Pennsylvania
Education in Montour County, Pennsylvania
National Register of Historic Places in Montour County, Pennsylvania